The coat of arms of the Komi Republic (SHRRF #153), designed by A. Neverov, was instituted by the law No. XII-20/1 on June 6, 1994 and reflects the mythic beliefs of the Komi peoples. The blazon has a field gules, featuring a bird of prey or with the face below corresponding with goddess Zarni An, and six unhorned elk heads. On December 17, 1997 the Republican State Council passed the law, which changed the official coat of arms definition in order to agree with the rules of heraldry.

A bird of prey in the traditional interpretation embodies the sun, authority and the upper world, while elk is associated with power, generosity and beauty. The combination of gules and or symbolizes sun, maternity and birth in the Komi folklore.

See also
 Coat of arms of Komi-Permyak Okrug

References

External links
  Profile

Komi Republic
Symbols introduced in 1994
Komi Republic
Komi
Komi